Bishop Cummins Reformed Episcopal Church is a Reformed Episcopal Church congregation in Catonsville, Maryland. Founded in 1874, the building it occupied in Baltimore from 1879 to 1961 is listed on the National Register of Historic Places under the name Cummins Memorial Church.

History of the church
Bishop Cummins REC is one of the oldest congregations in the Reformed Episcopal Church, which was founded by George David Cummins in December 1873. Cummins toured the northeast, establishing churches in New York, Montreal, Chicago, Philadelphia and Ottawa before returning to Baltimore. In 1874, he led a group in holding services under the name Church of the Rock of Ages. The church incorporated in 1877 and began construction on a Gothic Revival church on Lafayette Square in 1878. Cummins died later that year, and the church was renamed in his honor.

In 1961, under the leadership of the Rev. Daniel G. Cox and with the support of longtime member and vestryman and future Maryland Gov. William Donald Schaefer, the church relocated to the suburban community of Catonsville. Its name was changed to the present name in 2007.

Other notable parishioners in the mid-20th century included disability advocate Joni Eareckson, who was confirmed at Bishop Cummins prior to the diving accident that left her paralyzed, and Edward and Joyce Brumbaugh, whose daughter Gayle married Michael Ford, son of then-Vice President Gerald Ford, in 1973. Cox officiated the ceremony at a different Catonsville church due to construction at Bishop Cummins.

Architecture

Exterior
The historic building is located at 1210 West Lanvale Street in Baltimore at the corner of Carrollton Avenue. It is a Gothic Revival-style church executed in granite ashlar. It features a high-pitched gable roof; a short, two-staged tower in the southwest corner with a slate-shingled, hexagonal roof; and a large stained glass, lancet window with wood tracery.

A decorative cross sits atop the apex of the gable. Each side of the church has narrow aisles above which is on each side a clerestory of five stained glass lancet-arched windows. The Carrollton Avenue east end facade is fronted by a one-story, shed-roofed narthex arcade with lancet-arched portals at either end. The west end of the church adjoins a rowhouse rectory.

Interior
The entrance of the church is on the east end though the narthex, with the pulpit and choir at the west end of the church. The church includes a U-shaped balcony along the south, east, and north walls. The interior roof is gambrel-shaped and supported by eight decorative brackets.

Preservation
Cummins Memorial Church was listed on the National Register of Historic Places in 1979. It was described in its nomination as "significant 1) as Baltimore's first Reformed Episcopal congregation, 2) as an elegant contribution to the Gothic Revival in mid-19th century American architecture, and 3) as an integral element of one of Baltimore's finest urban parks, Lafayette Square."

After Bishop Cummins relocated, the building was occupied by Emmanuel Christian Community Church and Greater Hope Church of God in Christ; it was sold in 2022 to an undisclosed buyer.

References

External links

Bishop Cummins Reformed Episcopal Church Official Website
, including undated photo, at Maryland Historical Trust

Churches in Baltimore
Harlem Park, Baltimore
Reformed Episcopal church buildings
Properties of religious function on the National Register of Historic Places in Baltimore
Churches completed in 1878
19th-century Episcopal church buildings
Gothic Revival church buildings in Maryland
Churches on the National Register of Historic Places in Maryland
Churches in Baltimore County, Maryland